Pere Calders i Rossinyol (29 September 1912 – 21 July 1994) was a Catalan writer and cartoonist.

Biography 
He became known at the beginning of the 1930s for his drawings, articles and stories which were published in newspapers and magazines. At twenty-four, he published his first books: the collection of stories El primer arlequí (The first harlequin), and the brief novel La glòria del doctor Larén (Doctor Laren's glory). Exiled in Mexico for twenty-three years, along with his brother-in-law (the writer Avel·lí Artís Gener "Tísner"), he composed his most critically well-received works, in particular the short stories Cròniques de la veritat oculta (Chronicles of the hidden truth, 1955) and Gent de l'alta vall (People of the high valley, 1957), and the novel Ronda naval sota la boira (Raval round under the fog, 1966). He returned to Catalonia in 1962. Alongside publishing work and journalistic collaborations, he wrote L'ombra de l'atzavara (The shadow of the agave, 1964), with which he won the Premi Sant Jordi de novel·la. With the arrival of democracy,  he became popular as a result of the success of the theatrical assembly Antaviana, created by the company Dagoll Dagom, based on some of Pere's short stories. Since then, most of his books have been republished. He received the Premi d'Honor de les Lletres Catalanes (1986), and shortly before his death was awarded the National Prize from Journalism (1993).

He was a Member of the Association of Catalan-language Writers.

Principal works

Editions in English 
 Brush; translated by Louise Lewis; pictures by Carme Solé Vendrell. London: Blackie, 1982. 
 Brush; translated by Marguerite Feitlowitz; pictures by Carme Solé Vendrell. Brooklyn, N.Y.: Kane/Miller, 1986. 
 The virgin of the railway and other stories; translated by Amanda Bath. Warminster: Aris & Phillips, 1991. 
"Subtle invasion" and "Catalans about the world" in Catalonia, a self-portrait; edited and translated by Josep Miquel Sobrer. Bloomington: Indiana University Press, 1992. 
"The desert", a short story in The Dedalus book of Spanish fantasy; edited and translated by Margaret Jull Costa and Annella McDermott. Sawtry: Dedalus; 1999.

Collected works 
 El primer arlequí (The First Harlequin) (1936)
 Unitats de xoc (Pieces of Conflict) (1938)
 Memòries especials (Special Memories) (1942)
 Cròniques de la veritat oculta (Chronicles of the Hidden Truth) (1955)
 Gent de l'alta vall (People of the High Valley ) (1957)
 Demà a les tres de la matinada (Tomorrow at Three in the Morning) (1959)
 Invasió subtil i altres contes (Subtle Invasion and Other Stories) (1978)
 Antaviana (Antaviana) (1979), with Dagoll Dagom
 Tot s'aprofita (1983)
 El sabeu, aquell? (1983)
 De teves a meves: trenta-dos contes que acaben més o menys bé (From Yours to Mine: Thirty-Three Stories That End More or Less Well) (1984)
 Els nens voladors (The Flying Children) (1984)
 Tres per cinc, quinze (Three Times Five, Fifteen) (1984)
 La cabra i altres narracions (The Goat and Other Narratives) (1984)
 El desordre públic (Public Disorder) (1984)
 Un estrany al jardí (A Stranger in the Garden) (1985)
 El barret fort i altres inèdits (The Bowler Hat and Other Unpublished Works) (1987)
 Raspall (Brush) (1987)
 Kalders i Tísner, dibuixos de guerra a L'Esquella de la Torratxa (1991)
 L'honor a la deriva (Honor Adrift) (1992)
 Mesures, alarmes i prodigis (1994)
 La lluna a casa i altres contes (The Moon at Home and Other Stories) (1995)
 Cartes d'amor (Love Letters) (1996)
 Tots els contes (All Stories) (2008)

Novels 
 La glòria del doctor Larén (The Glory of Doctor Larén) (1936)
 L'ombra de l'atzavara (The Shade of the Agave Plant) (1964)
 Ronda naval sota la boira (Naval Patrol Through the Fog) (1966)
 Aquí descansa Nevares (Here Rests Nevares) (1967)
 Gaeli i l'home Déu (1984)
 La ciutat cansada (The Tired City) (2008) (unfinished)
 Sense anar tant lluny (Without Going Too Far) (2009) (unfinished)
 La marxa cap al mar (The Walk to Sea) (2009) (unfinished)
 L'amor de Joan (Juan's Love) (2009) (unfinished)

References

External links
 Pere Calders at the AELC, The Association of Catalan Language Writers. 
 Pere Calders in LletrA, Catalan Literature Online (Open University of Catalonia) 
 Pere Calders legacy

Novelists from Catalonia
Speculative fiction writers from Catalonia
Catalan-language writers
Short story writers from Catalonia
Premi d'Honor de les Lletres Catalanes winners
1912 births
1994 deaths
20th-century Spanish novelists
20th-century short story writers